Morales del Arcediano is a locality and minor local entity located in the municipality of Santiago Millas, in León province, Castile and León, Spain. As of 2020, it has a population of 51.

Geography 
Morales del Arcediano is located 54km west-southwest of León, Spain.

References

Populated places in the Province of León